The qualifications for this List of Alabama lakes is that the lake contains sports fish, is open to the public and is managed by Alabama Department of Conservation and Natural Resources or other state or federal agencies.

See: Alabama  List of U.S. National Forests

Alabama State public fishing 
The Alabama Wildlife and Freshwater Fisheries Division, Department of Conservation and Natural Resources, manages 23 public lakes in 20 counties throughout the state. Since the program was initiated in the late 1940s, its purpose has remained unchanged: provide quality fishing at an affordable price in areas of Alabama that lack sufficient natural waters to meet the needs of the public.
All lakes were originally stocked with largemouth bass, bluegill (bream), redear sunfish (shellcracker), and channel catfish. White crappie and black crappie have become established in many lakes. Channel catfish are stocked in every lake during the fall. Hybrid striped bass and rainbow trout are stocked annually in designated lakes.

District 1 
Fayette County is a prohibition or dry county.
Lamar County is a prohibition or dry county.
Marion County is a prohibition or dry county.
 Bankhead Lake

District 2 
Clay County is a prohibition or dry county.
DeKalb County is a prohibition or dry county.

District 3 
Bibb County is a prohibition or dry county.
its only one

District 4 
Chambers County Lake has a courtesy pier by the boat ramp.
Lee County Lake is the only lake with fishermen cabins and has a courtesy pier by the boat ramp.
 Weiss Lake is in Cherokee County and occupies . It is known nationwide as the "Crappie Capital of the World."

District 5 
The coordinates of Escambia County Lake are 
Monroe County is a prohibition or dry county.
Washington County is a prohibition or dry county.

District 6 
 Coffee County Lake (lake closed). Coffee County is a prohibition or dry county.
Geneva County is a prohibition or dry county.

Public reservoirs

Other public lakes 
 Lake Eufaula (Also extends into Georgia)
 Gantt Lake
 Lake Guntersville - The largest lake in Alabama
 Lake Harding (Also extends into Georgia)
 Holt Lake
 Inland Lake
 Lake Jackson (Also extends into Florida)
 Lay Lake
 Little Bear Creek Reservoir
 Logan-Martin Lake
 Lake Lurleen
 Neely Henry Lake
 Lake Pickwick (Also extends into Mississippi)
 Lake Purdy
 Ski Lake
 Smith Lake
 Lake Tholocco
 Lake Tuscaloosa
 Upper Bear Creek Reservoir
 Lake Wedowee-Randolph County
 W. F. Lake
 William Bill Danelly Reservoir

Mobile County

See also 

 Fishing in Alabama
 List of lakes in the United States
 List of dams and reservoirs in Alabama

References 
 Alabama State Owned and Operated Public Fishing Lakes

Notes

External links 
 Alabama Lake Levels
 www.neelyhenry.com Information about Lake Neely Henry

Lakes
Alabama